Épreville is a commune in the Seine-Maritime department in the Normandy region in northern France.

Geography

Population

Places of interest
 The church of St. Denis, dating from the seventeenth century.
 A medieval dovecote.

See also
Communes of the Seine-Maritime department

References

External links

 Official commune website 

Communes of Seine-Maritime